

Legend

List

References

2008-09